The Royal Rivalry refers to the U.S. college rivalry games between the James Madison Dukes and the Old Dominion Monarchs of the Sun Belt Conference. It is an intra-conference match-up between two Div. I FBS public universities, James Madison University and Old Dominion University, in the state of Virginia.

History
Both schools began sports competitions in the early 1970's as former Division II in-state opponents. The competitions intensified when both schools competed as full members of the Colonial Athletic Association following ODU's move to the conference in 1991. This undeclared in-state rivalry would last just over 20 years before ODU relocated to Conference USA in 2014 to become a member of the FBS. JMU remained in the CAA but still competed with ODU in other sports outside of football. In 2022, both schools joined the Sun Belt Conference.

Following the conference relocation for both schools, ODU and JMU announced the TowneBank-sponsored Royal Rivalry Challenge. Starting in 2022, it would include all 20 head-to-head matchups in sports between the schools with points awarded to each school for corresponding victories in the games. The winner is to be awarded a trophy that is still in the design process from both schools' art departments.

All-time series results

Football
The Old Dominion and James Madison football programs began competing in 2011 when ODU joined the CAA as an FCS independent after restarting football in 2009. Following ODU's departure from the CAA in 2012, the two schools took nearly a ten-year hiatus from football matchups before they both joined the Sun Belt in 2022. The football rivalry was restarted in the 2022 Div. I FBS football season where both schools competed in the 2022 Oyster Bowl, with the Dukes beating the Monarchs for the first time 37–3.

James Madison currently plays their football games at Bridgeforth Stadium; Old Dominion at S.B. Ballard Stadium.

Source: JMU Sports

Basketball

Men's basketball
During their tenures in the CAA, ODU defeated JMU in 4 conference tournament championships. JMU holds their basketball games at Atlantic Union Bank Center; ODU at Chartway Arena.

Soccer

Men's soccer
James Madison leads the all-time series in soccer 19–13–8.

See also  
 List of NCAA college football rivalry games

References

External links 
 James Madison Dukes
 Old Dominion Monarchs

College baseball rivalries in the United States
College basketball rivalries in the United States
College football rivalries in the United States
College soccer rivalries in the United States
College sports rivalries in the United States
College sports in Virginia
James Madison Dukes
Old Dominion Monarchs
Sports rivalries in Virginia